Ian Livingstone's Deathtrap Dungeon is an action-adventure video game developed by Asylum Studios and published by Eidos Interactive for PlayStation and Microsoft Windows in 1998. It is based on the adventure gamebook Deathtrap Dungeon (the sixth in the Fighting Fantasy series) written by Ian Livingstone, and published by Puffin Books in 1984.

Gameplay
The game is a third-person action-adventure, with the player taking the role of an adventurer (either the Amazon "Red Lotus" or the barbarian "Chaindog"), who at the invitation of a wizard explores a series of dungeons and must overcome both monsters and traps to find riches.

Development
Ian Livingstone was heavily involved in determining the game's level design and art style. The aesthetics and atmosphere are manifestly inspired by Italian artist Giovanni Battista Piranesi, whose ruins drawings fascinated Ian Livingstone.

Though the game's 3D engine is very similar to that of Tomb Raider, another Eidos-published game with a development cycle which overlapped that of Deathtrap Dungeon, the two games were developed in isolation.

Livingstone said the character Red Lotus was created as "a combination of all the girls who have caught my eye over the past 20 years. Not all of these girls were real, though. Comic books have had a big influence on her creation."

Reception

Deathtrap Dungeon received mixed reviews on both platforms according to the review aggregation website GameRankings. Next Generation said that the flaws in the PlayStation original "continually distracted us from the fun parts. Overall, there are only three words for this game – bad, bad, bad." Edge gave both the PlayStation and PC versions each a score of seven out of ten, saying that the former version "isn't going to seriously challenge Tomb Raider 2s dominance of this genre, but it is a solid, playable and well-designed fantasy romp that will at least pass the time until Lara Croft's next appearance"; and later saying that the latter version was "certainly worthy of attention, though not, as Eidos might suspect, because of the presence of a busty heroine."

Reviews
SF Site

References

External links

1998 video games
Action-adventure games
Eidos Interactive games
Fantasy video games
PlayStation (console) games
Single-player video games
Video games based on novels
Video games based on tabletop role-playing games
Video games featuring female protagonists
Windows games
Video games developed in the United Kingdom